The 1984 Aloha Bowl, part of the 1984 bowl game season, took place on December 29, 1984, at Aloha Stadium in Honolulu, Hawaii. The game featured the Notre Dame Fighting Irish, and the SMU Mustangs of the Southwest Conference, meeting for the first time in 26 years. SMU won the game 27–20 in front of a then Aloha Bowl-record crowd of 41,777. This was SMU's last bowl game appearance and bowl win before the Death Penalty shut the program down in 1987.

Game summary
SMU scored on its first two offensive possessions, on a seven-yard touchdown carry by Jeff Atkins and later Don King's 12-yard pass to Cobby Morrison gave the Mustangs a 14–0 lead. Notre Dame responded with 10 unanswered points before Brandy Brownlee connected on a 47-yard field goal to give SMU a 17–10 lead at halftime.

The Fighting Irish tied the game on Mark Brooks' 11-yard touchdown run in the third quarter, but SMU regained the lead on its next possession with Brownlee's second field goal of the game. The Mustangs were able to work on the clock for most of the second half due to the strong running of Atkins and Reggie Dupard, each of whom ran for more than 100 yards in the contest. Dupard's two-yard scoring run gave SMU a 10-point lead with six minutes left in the game and the Mustangs held off a late Notre Dame rally to win, 27–20. Dupard rushed for 103 yards.

Statistics

Rushing
SMU - Atkins 17-112
Notre Dame - Pinkett 24-136

Passing
SMU - King 9-17-153
Notre Dame - Beuerlein 11-23-144

Receiving
SMU - Atkins 2-31, Hashaway 2-27, Morris 2-27
Notre Dame - Jefferson 2-37, Howard 2-24, Bavaro 2-16

References

1984–85 NCAA football bowl games
1984
1984
1984
December 1984 sports events in the United States
Aloha